Uchchhal is a village and tehsil in Tapi district in Gujarat, India. Located at Gujarat Maharashtra border navapur. 107 kilometre far from Surat. It has a railway station Gujarat Maharashtra border. Railway station is common among Maharashtra and Gujarat. Railway is available from navapur Maharashtra.

Villages in Tapi district